Egor Gerasimov and Alexander Kudryavtsev were the defending champions, but they decided not to defend their title .

Yuki Bhambri and Mahesh Bhupathi won the title, defeating Saketh Myneni and Sanam Singh in the final 6–3, 4–6, [10–5] .

Seeds

Draw

References
 Main Draw

Delhi Open - Doubles